Sandy Point State Park is a public recreation area on Chesapeake Bay, located at the western end of the Chesapeake Bay Bridge in Anne Arundel County, Maryland. The state park is known for the popularity of its swimming beach, with annual attendance exceeding one million visitors. The park grounds include the Sandy Point Farmhouse, which is listed on the National Register of Historic Places.

History
In 1948, the state purchased the site of a ferry landing that had served the Chesapeake Bay Ferry System on its run across the bay to Kent Island at what is now Matapeake State Park. The park opened in 1952 with racially segregated beaches and bathhouses which led to litigation in 1955. The U.S. Supreme Court ordered the park to become integrated in Mayor and City Council of Baltimore City v. Dawson, which ultimately extended the Fourteenth Amendment to state beaches and other recreational facilities.

Activities and amenities
The park offers swimming beaches, fishing, crabbing, hiking, wildlife viewing, nature center, picnicking, marina store, and boat rentals. The adjacent Corcoran Woods forest preserve includes  of hiking trails. The historic Sandy Point Farmhouse may be viewed from the main park road and is not open to the public.

In January, the park hosts the annual Maryland State Police Polar Bear Plunge, where participants run into the Chesapeake Bay to raise money for Special Olympics.

References

External links

Sandy Point State Park Maryland Department of Natural Resources

State parks of Maryland
Parks in Anne Arundel County, Maryland
Beaches of Maryland
Protected areas established in 1948
1948 establishments in Maryland